Cycas indica is a species of cycad endemic to India. The species grows in the dry plains of Karnataka and is known for its branching habit. A species Cycas swamyi also considered as a variety of Cycas circinalis is considered as a synonym of this species.

References

External links 
 Sydney botanical gardens

indica
Plants described in 2007